Karvaneh (also Romanized as Kārvāneh; also known as Garvāneh, Gīrvānrā, and Kīrwānra) is a village in Kharqan Rural District, in the Central District of Razan County, Hamadan Province, Iran. At the 2006 census, its population was 103, in 35 families.

References 

Populated places in Razan County